Foly is a surname. Notable people with the surname include:

Adriaen Foly (1664–1701), Danish painter
Liane Foly (born 1962), French blues and jazz singer, actress, presenter, and impressionist

See also
Foley (disambiguation)
Foli